Maria Beneyto Cuñat (14 May 1925 – 15 March 2011) was a Spanish poet. She was a recipient of the Premio de las Letras Valencianas.

Biography
Born in Valencia, Beneyto moved with her family to Madrid at age three, a city where she remained until 1937. After receiving an education in Castilian, in the first years after the Spanish Civil War she encountered an environment where, for the first time, Valencian occupied a prominent position. It was in these years that her dedication to writing solidified, in an especially self-taught manner which was common to a great number of writers of her generation. She also began a relationship with literary groups of Valencia. This education, straddling the two cultures of the Castilian learned in Madrid and her native Valencian, explains Maria Beneyto's literary bilingualism.

Maria Beneyto died on 15 March 2011.

Work
Beneyto's earliest work was in Castilian: Canción olvidada (1947) and Eva en el tiempo (1952). During the 1950s she published her first two poems in Valencian: Otra voz (1952) and Rayas al aire (1956). In 1958 she produced her first prose work, the Castilian novel La prometida. She did not return to publishing in Valencian until the 1960s, with the novels La gente que vive al mundo (1966) and La mujer fuerte (1967). In 1977 she published the poetry collection Vidrio herido de sangre, and then began a long period of silence. This continued until the 1990s.

In 1993 she published her Antología poética and the collections Tras sepulta la ternura and Poemas de las cuatro estaciones, as well as three collections in Castilian: Archipiélago (unpublished poetry 1975–1993), Nocturnidad y alevosía y Hojas para algún día de noviembre, and an Antología poética. In 1994 a new collection appeared: Para desconocer la primavera. 1997 was again a prolific year in terms of publications, with a reissue of La gente que vive al mundo, the anthology Poesía (1952–1993), and a new collection: Elegías de la piedra quebradiza. Her last collection was published in 2003: Bressoleig insomnia anger.

Throughout her literary career, Beneyto's work had been anthologized in several poetry collections, including Las voces de la medusa (1991), Paisaje emergente. Treinta poetas catalanas del siglo XX (1999), Contemporáneas. Antología de poetas de los Países Catalanes (1999), and Homenaje a la palabra. Veinticinco años de poesía al País Valenciano (1999). This places her as one of the main figures – along with Vicent Andrés Estellés, and Joan Fuster – of the Valencian poetic generation of the 1950s.

Publications
 Canción olvidada – 1947
 Eva en el tiempo – 1952
 Altra veu – 1952
 Ratlles a l'aire – 1952
 Poemas de la Ciudad – 1956 (Joaquin Horta Editor, Barcelona)
 La prometida – 1958
 La gente que vive al mundo – 1966
 La mujer fuerte – 1967
 Vidrio herido de sangre – 1977
 Antologia poètica i els poemaris – 1993
 Després de soterrada la tendresa – 1993
 Poemes de les quatre estacions – 1993
 Archipiélago – 1993
 Nocturnidad y alevosía – 1993
 Hojas para algún día de noviembre – 1993
 Bressoleig a l'insomni de la ira – 2003

Honors
 1992: 
 January 2000: Recognized by the Corts Valencianes, on the occasion of International Women's Day

References

Sources
 

1925 births
2011 deaths
20th-century Spanish novelists
20th-century Spanish poets
21st-century Spanish poets
Catalan-language poets
People from Valencia
Spanish women poets
Writers from the Valencian Community
21st-century Spanish women writers
20th-century Spanish women writers